The November 2012 San Francisco general elections were on November 6, 2012, in San Francisco, California. The elections included six seats to the San Francisco Board of Supervisors, four seats to the San Francisco Board of Education, four seats to the San Francisco Community College Board, and seven San Francisco ballot measures.

Board of Supervisors

Board of Education 
Three incumbents ran for reelection, while one, Norman Yee, ran for a seat on the San Francisco Board of Supervisors. Each voter was allowed to cast up to four votes.

Community College Board 
Three incumbents ran for reelection, while one, Rodrigo Santos, is seeking his first election after being appointed by Mayor Ed Lee. Each voter was allowed to cast up to four votes.

Propositions 

Note: "City" refers to the San Francisco municipal government.

Proposition A 
Proposition A would levy an annual $79 parcel tax for eight years to provide funding for several City College of San Francisco programs. This measure required a two-thirds majority to pass.

Proposition B 
Proposition B would authorize the City to issue $195 million in bonds to fund repairs and improvements in parks and public open spaces. This measure required a two-thirds majority to pass.

Proposition C 
Proposition C would establish a Housing Trust Fund to fund construction and maintenance of affordable housing, provide for loan assistance and foreclosure relief, and fund neighborhood improvements; reduce on-site affordable-housing requirements; and authorize the construction of 30,000 low-rental units in the city.

Proposition D 
Proposition D would shift the elections of City Attorney and Treasurer to the same year as those of the Mayor, District Attorney, and Assessor-Recorder.

Proposition E 
Proposition E would phase in a gross receipts tax and phase out a payroll tax in a revenue-neutral manner and increase business registration fees.

Proposition F 
Proposition F would require the City to study the draining of Hetch Hetchy Reservoir and the identifying of replacement water and power sources.

Proposition G 
Proposition G would make it City policy to oppose corporate personhood and that corporations are subject to political spending limits.

External links
 San Francisco Department of Elections
 San Francisco Voter Pamphlets and Propositions dating back to 1907 at the San Francisco Public Library.

San Francisco 11
2012 11
Elections 11
San Francisco 11
2010s in San Francisco